Mr. George and Other Odd Persons is a collection of fantasy and horror short stories by American author August Derleth, written under the pseudonym of Stephen Grendon. It was released in 1963 by Arkham House in an edition of 2,546 copies.  Most of the stories had appeared previously in the magazine Weird Tales.  Two appeared in The Arkham Sampler.  The title story was dramatized for the Thriller TV series.

Contents

Mr. George and Other Odd Persons contains the following tales:

 "Introduction" by August Derleth
 "Mr. George"
 "Parrington's Pool"
 "A Gentleman From Prague"
 "The Man on B-17"
 "Blessed Are the Meek"
 "Mara"
 "The Blue Spectacles"
 "Alannah"
 "Dead Man's Shoes"
 "The Tsantsa in the Parlor"
 "Balu"
 "The Extra Passenger"
 "The Wind in the Lilacs"
 "Miss Eperson"
 "The Night Train to Lost Valley"
 "Bishop's Gambit"
 "Mrs. Manifold"

Sources 

1963 short story collections
Fantasy short story collections
Horror short story collections